Kumbapur-M-Narendra is a village in Dharwad district of Karnataka, India.

Demographics 
As of the 2011 Census of India there were 336 households in Kumbapur-M-Narendra and a total population of 1,481 consisting of 782 males and 699 females. There were 188 children ages 0-6.

References

Villages in Dharwad district